Kourbania (pl.  from  and ultimately from , sacrificial rite analogous to Jewish qorban) is a Christianized animal sacrifice in parts of Greece. It usually involves the slaughter of lambs as "kourbania" offerings to saints. 

In antiquity the sacrifice was offered for health or following an accident or illness, as a votive offering promised to the Lord by the community, or by the relatives of the victim. Writing in 1979, Stella Georgoudi stated that the custom survived in "some villages of modern Greece" and was "slowly deteriorating and dying out". 

A similar custom from North Macedonia and Bulgaria known as kurban  is celebrated on St. George's day.

Description
The practice involves the blood sacrifice (θυσία, thusia) of a domestic animal to either a saint, taken as the tutelary of the village in question, or dedicated to the Holy Trinity or the Virgin. The animal is slaughtered outside the village church, during or after the Divine Liturgy, or on the eve of the feast day. The animal is sometimes led into the church before the icon of the saint, or even locked in the church during the night preceding the sacrifice. Most of the kourbania are spread between April and October. 

The descriptions (for both the Byzantine and Turkish periods) of this θυσία, or kurban (in Turkish), are numerous indeed, and are an example of one popular element which the Turks adopted from Byzantium. The most detailed description is given by the sixteenth-century Turkish slave Bartholomaeus Gourgieuiz:

In Cappadocia (Anatolia)
In the late nineteenth century, Greek Christians of the village of Zele (Sylata) in Cappadocia sacrificed animals to Saint Charalambos especially in time of illness. Though the Greeks frequently referred to these sacrifices by the Turkish term Kurban, the sacrificial practices went back to Byzantine and pagan times as is evident from several factors. They frequently referred to these sacrifices by the ancient Greek terms θυσία and θάλι. The question of Christian borrowing from the Muslim Kurban sacrifice is probably restricted to the philological aspect, for the pagan sacrifice seems to have remained very lively and widespread in Byzantine times.

In Heracleopolis (Anatolia)
One of the most spectacular examples of its existence in Byzantine Anatolia was the sacrifice of the fawn to St. Athenogenes at Pedachthoe/Heracleopolis  on July 17 (July 16). On that day the young animal and its mother passed before the altar of the monastery church of St. Athenogenes while the Gospels were being read. The fawn was sacrificed, cooked, and eaten by the congregation and thus the faithful celebrated the glory of the martyred saint. The pagan usage of animal sacrifice survived also in the Byzantine practice of slaughtering and roasting animals after the celebration of ecclesiastical festivals.

In Lesbos
In the village of Mistegna on Lesbos, the kourbania is to the Akindinoi saints on one of the Sundays following Easter. Also on Lesbos, the bull sacrifice to Saint Charalambos is set on a Sunday in May, on Mount Taurus outside the village of Saint Paraskevi.

In Thrace
In the village of Mega Monastiri in northeastern Thrace, the community used to buy the most robust calves and raise them specifically for the kourbania. These animals designated for sacrifice were never used for farm labour. In some instances, the animal was bathed and decorated with flowers or ribbons, its horns decorated with strips of gold foil and led to sacrifice through all the streets in a joyous procession. 

The village priest then performed a number of rites to complete the consecration of the victim before the killing, but unlike the practice in antiquity, the act of killing the animal is no special office and can be performed by anyone. The sacrifice is followed by a festival. The food for the festival is prepared under the supervision of the churchwarden, and is blessed by the priest before the meal begins. In Mega Monastiri, these meals were the scene of gatherings of lineages or clans, each with its own stone table in the churchyard, the place of honour on the eastern end of the table reserved for the clan eldest. 

The prayers said by the priest over the victim have a long tradition of attestation, dating from at least the 8th century, establishing the animal sacrifice as long-standing within Christian tradition, over at least a millennium.

Criticism
The sixteenth canon of the Synod of Carthage asked the emperor to put an end to this practice, while the commentary of Balsamon indicates that it was widespread in the twelfth century, and it has survived to the present day.

In the late 18th century, a monk Nicodemus denounced the kourbania as a "barbaric custom" and "vestige of ancient pagan error", without success, as he was himself accused of heresy by the village priests. 

Also in the 18th century, bishop Theophiles of Campania attacked the custom as an imitation of the "vain Hellenes". Greek ethnographers in the 19th century did not hesitate to identify the kourbani as a survival of pre-Christian Greek antiquity.  

Georgoudi (1979) prefers a comparison with the Hebrew sacrifices korban of the Old Testament, citing early medieval canons and conciliaries which denounce customs such as cooking meat in the sanctuary as Jewish and Armenian Christian, not Greek, practice.

See also

 Animal sacrifice
 Christopaganism
 Crucifixion in the Philippines
 Dušni Brav (in Serbia)
 Eid al-Adha (Qurbani, 'Kurban Bayram')
 Folk Catholicism
 Madagh (in Armenia)
 Tama (votive)
 Slaughter offering

References

Sources
 Stella Georgoudi. 'Sanctified Slaughter in Modern Greece: The "Kourbania" of the Saints.' In: Detienne and Vernant (Eds.). The Cuisine of Sacrifice among the Greeks. University of Chicago Press, 1989. pp. 183-203. 
(Translated from the French original, L'égorgement sanctifié en Grèce moderne : les Kourbania des saints  (1979), 271-307.)
 Speros Vryonis. The Decline of Medieval Hellenism in Asia Minor: and the Process of Islamization from the Eleventh Through the Fifteenth Century. Volume 4 of Publications of the Center for Medieval and Renaissance Studies. University of California Press, 1971. p. 490.

External links
 Bruce Alexander McClelland. "Chapter 4: Sacrifice in the Balkans." In: SACRIFICE, SCAPEGOAT, VAMPIRE: The Social and Religious Origins of the Bulgarian Folkloric Vampire. Ph.D. Thesis, May 1999. 
  ΤΟ   ΚΟΥΡΜΠΑΝΙ. Δημοτικό Διαμέρισμα Πετρούσας, ΓΙΑΝΝΙΚΕΙΟ ΓΥΜΝΑΣΙΟ ΠΕΤΡΟΥΣΑΣ ΔΡΑΜΑΣ. Retrieved: 21 December, 2013.

Animal sacrifice
Christian worship and liturgy
Greek culture
Greek folklore
Bulgarian folklore
Votive offering